Yoshiaki Miyanoue (born October 7, 1953 in Tokyo, Japan) is a jazz guitarist. Like Wes Montgomery, who exercised strong influence on Miyanoue, he plucks the strings with his thumb, not using a pick. He worked with organist Jimmy Smith, Dr. Lonnie Smith, drummer Philly Joe Jones, and bassist Andrew Simpkins among others.

Discography
What's Happened, Miya? (1978)
Song for Wes (1979)
Mellow Around (1980)
Riviera (1981)
Touch of Love (1981)
Nathalie (1983)
Dedicated to Wes Montgomery (1985)
Foxy Eyes (1988)
Smokin (Yoshiaki Miyanoue album) (1991)
Bluesland (1993)
The Thumb (1995)
L.A. Connection (1997)
Me, Myself & I (1999)
Live! (2000)
Live at the Kitty Kitty Brown (2002)
Spirits (2006)
Sunset Street (2007)

External links
Yoshiaki Miyanoue Official Website (In English)
Yoshiaki Miyanoue MySpace Page (In English)
Yoshiaki Miyanoue Official Website (In Japanese)

Japanese jazz guitarists
1953 births
Living people